Aigilia may refer to:
Aegilia (Attica), a deme of ancient Attica
Aigilia, ancient name of Antikythera, an island in the Aegean Sea
Aigilia, ancient name of Stouronisi, an island off Euboea

See also
Aegilia